Nicholas Hagiotheodorites (died 1175) was a Byzantine scholar, official, and Metropolitan of Athens.

The Hagiotheodorites family first appears in the early 12th century, and were all civil and religious functionaries. Nicholas and his two brothers all rose to occupy the highest offices under Manuel I Komnenos (r. 1143–1180): Michael Hagiotheodorites became epi tou kanikleiou, orphanotrophos, and logothetes tou dromou, while John Hagiotheodorites became Eparch of Constantinople and mesazon.

Nicholas Hagiotheodorites served as law teacher (nomophylax) and even held the post of maistor ton rhetoron ("master of the rhetoricians"). He then resided in Athens as its metropolitan bishop from ca. 1160 to his death in 1175. His successor was the scholar Michael Choniates.

References

Sources

 
 
 
 

1175 deaths
Year of birth unknown
12th-century Byzantine people
Byzantine officials
Officials of Manuel I Komnenos
Bishops of Athens
Logothetai tou dromou
Nicholas
Constantinopolitan Greeks
Clergy from Istanbul